Aloha is the second album by Todd Smith under the moniker El-Creepo! It was released on November 13, 2012.

Track listing

Background
In March 2012, Smith revealed that he was in the process of recording a new solo album with the El-Creepo! moniker. It was revealed that Polkadot Cadaver drummer Scott Radway was to co-write the album with him.

The songs Lock the World Outside, Slip the Noose, and Arabian Rose, were released onto YouTube by the label's official account before the album was released on November 13, 2012. It is the second album to be released by the label.

References

External links

2012 albums
Todd Smith (musician) albums